Linum ucranicum is a species of flowering plant in the flax genus Linum, family Linaceae, native to Ukraine and parts of European Russia. It is confined to chalk outcrops.

References

ucranicum
Flora of Ukraine
Flora of Central European Russia
Flora of East European Russia
Plants described in 1859